Joaquin Carlos "JC" Rahman Nava is a Filipino politician who serves as governor of Guimaras.

Career
Nava was governor of the province of Guimaras from 1998 to 2007. He returned as Guimaras governor after winning in the 2022 election. He succeeded Samuel Gumarin who launched a successful campaign to get elected mayor of the town of Buenavista in the same province.

Personal life
Nava is part of a political family. He is married to Maria Lucille Nava who served as Guimaras' representative in the House of Representatives while his brother Felipe "Nene" Nava is a provincial board member of the same province.

References

Living people
Governors of Guimaras